Guttman Shmuel Landau (Toby-Gutman Samuilovich Lando, also known as Guttman Lando or Gutman Landau; 1877 or 1878 – May 21, 1942) was a leader of the Bessarabian Jewish community, active in the Moldavian Democratic Republic and Romania. His social work was tied to the city of Chișinău, where he was also a civil servant and merchant. A member of the Moldavian Republic's legislature (Sfatul Țării) in 1918, he returned to prominence during World War II, designated by the antisemitic regime of Ion Antonescu as President of the Chișinău Judenrat, effectively answering for the Chișinău Ghetto. He was unable to prevent his constituents' deportation and indiscriminate killing in Transnistria Governorate, but was spared their fate until May 20, 1942. He committed suicide the following day; his wife attempted the same, but was rescued and survived the war.

Biography
Landau was active in Bessarabia, a province of the Russian Empire to 1917. In September 1917, just ahead of the October Revolution, he served with Nicolae Alexandri, P. M. Morgulis, and V. G. Globa on commission overseeing the Russian parliamentary election at Chișinău (Kishinev). He became politically prominent in 1918, when Bessarabia became the quasi-independent "Moldavian Democratic Republic", with Chișinău as its capital. Aged 40 at the time, Landau was integrated into the Republic's civil service, while also taking a seat in the Sfatul Țării legislature. Subsequently, Landau integrated into the Jewish and Gentile life of Greater Romania. A shopkeeper in Chișinău by 1929, he also served on the board of Cultura și Munca ("Culture and Labor", the kehilla), under Yehuda Leib Tsirelson. In March 1936, during the trial of Petre Constantinescu-Iași and his group of anti-fascists (charged by the authorities with having put up a front for the illegal Communist Party), he appeared as a character reference for co-defendant Paulina Rosenberg. Ilya Ehrenburg and Vasily Grossman also note that he was a "popular social activist".

In April 1940, almost a year into World War II, the Romanian Army staged a general mobilization in defense of the national borders. In that context, Landau represented Chișinău's Israelite Community on the city board for providing relief to the families of new recruits. In June 1940, the Soviet Union staged its occupation of Bessarabia. This was received as a shock in Romania, where an Axis-aligned regime took over, with Ion Antonescu at its helm. Over the following months, the regime, which inherited and enforced antisemitic laws passed in the late 1930s, constructed a conspiracy theory, blaming Jews for the Soviet occupation and for alleged acts of terror. The allegations were immediately disproved by community leaders such as Horia Carp and Wilhelm Filderman, but, as historian Dennis Deletant writes, "these details [...] had little impact on the officers and men of the Romanian army of 1940. The whole anti-Semitic argument rested on a total denial of these facts." According to Landau's later testimony, some of his fellow Chișinău Jews, possibly including members of his own family, were actually deported to the Gulag under Soviet rule.

On June 22, 1941, Romania joined in Germany's surprise attack on the Soviet Union, and retook Bessarabia. The Jews of Chișinău were trapped under a military occupation, and had to move into a Ghetto, delineated in the late days of July. On August 1 the Ghetto Committee was created by the Romanians. It had Landau as its president, with Avraham Șapira and E. Bittman assisting him, and 19 other intellectuals serving as regular members. Landau personally obtained that he be allowed to open a bakery and a hospital (the latter of which was staffed by the Army), and negotiated the conditions of forced labor by the Jewish captives. The situation soon deteriorated, with food becoming scarce and some 15 or 30 people dying each day within the Ghetto. The hospital was also dismantled, with the Army taking back its donations for reasons of "military expediency". By August, Jewish labor squadrons were randomly murdered by the soldiers. In one such incident, Captain Radu Ionescu ordered his machine-gun company to fire into a crowd of Jewish workers.

On October 8, the authorities began carrying out a plan for the mass deportation of Chișinău Jews into Transnistria Governorate, where other Jews were already being massacred or left to die (see Holocaust in Romania). With the other Ghetto leaders, Landau addressed an appeal to Constantin Vasiliu, the Gendarmerie commander, attesting that his community was loyal to Romania, and had suffered under Soviet rule, while noting that the mass of the designated deportees were frail people. The letter's minimal request was a postponement of the transports to spring, when the Jews could "more easily adapt" to a new home. As noted by historian Paul A. Shapiro, Landau and the others most likely knew that "death of the deportees" was the desired outcome of Vasiliu's project: "Their appeal for postponement would have made no sense, however, if they had betrayed awareness".

The appeal was bluntly rejected by Vasiliu, while Șapira tried in vain to obtain a postponement from Antonescu himself. On October 7, as panic engulfed the Ghetto, Landau also addressed a telegram to Antonescu, asking him "very submissively" to "grant pity on [the Chișinău Jews]". Nevertheless, deportations continued at a steady pace. According to Landau's wife Sara, eighteen of her own relatives were deported on the last train from Chișinău, and did not survive deportation, being either shot or dying from typhus. Her husband was intensely petitioned by relatives of the deportees, answering them that he knew nothing "about where they were sent".

On October 22, Antonescu gave an order excepting baptized Jews and former Sfatul deputies from being deported—thereby allowing the Landaus to remain in Chișinău. The Romanian regime revoked that order on March 30, 1942, when Antonescu instigated the "cleansing of the terrain". This meant the deportation of the 425 Jews remaining in Bessarabia (257 of whom were in the Ghetto, including paraplegics and mental patients). Despite having saved 23,800 lei for bribes, the Landaus could not buy protection. On May 20, as the order came for their evacuation, they decided to commit suicide together by morphine overdose. A search party team found the couple still breathing, sending them to hospital. Sara was rescued and, interned, narrowly avoided deportation; Guttman died in intensive care, on the morning of May 21. His death remains one of many forced suicide cases in the closing Ghetto—9 others are mentioned by name in Ehrenburg and Grossman's book. Sara Landau's presence was tolerated in Chișinău for the next year, as the orders for deportation were no longer enforced, and, in mid-1943, ceased altogether. Following the resumption of Soviet control in 1944, she gave testimony on the Ghetto's plight and the deaths in her own family to Soviet investigators.

Notes

References
Dennis Deletant, Hitler's Forgotten Ally: Ion Antonescu and His Regime, Romania, 1940-1944. London: Palgrave Macmillan, 2006.  
Ilya Ehrenburg, Vasily Grossman, The Complete Black Book of Russian Jewry. New Brunswick: Transaction Publishers, 2009.  
Paul A. Shapiro, The Kishinev Ghetto, 1941–1942. A Documentary History of the Holocaust in Romania's Contested Borderlands. Tuscaloosa: University of Alabama Press, 2015.  

1870s births
1942 suicides
Moldovan MPs 1917–1918
Moldovan civil servants
Romanian activists
Romanian businesspeople
Romanian philanthropists
Bessarabian Jews
Romanian Jews
The Holocaust in Bessarabia and Bukovina
Drug-related suicides in Romania
Suicides in Moldova
Suicides by Jews during the Holocaust
Romanian Jews who died in the Holocaust